Rabbi Yisroel Moshe Olewski was the rabbi of Radziejów, Poland prior to the holocaust. After the holocaust, he was one of the rabbis of Bergen-Belsen and the Chief Rabbi of Celle. Later, after emigrating to the United States he was the founder of the Gerrer yeshiva in Brooklyn.

Biography
Rabbi Yisroel Moshe Olewski was born in Osięciny Poland on September 26, 1916. His father was Rabbi Yehuda Aryeh and his mother was Henna Rivka, the daughter of Rabbi Dovid Shlomo Zalman Neiman who was the Rabbi of Osięciny. Rabbi Yisroel Moshe Olewski's father died when he was 6 years old and he was sent to study in a yeshiva in Włocławek. Thereafter, he studied in a yeshiva in Warsaw and then in Yeshiva Chachmei Lublin. When he became of age, Rabbi Olewski married and settled in his father-in-law's hometown of Izbica Kujawska.

Rabbi of Radziejów
Rabbi Olewski received his rabbinical ordination from Rabbi Menachem Ziemba. Thereafter he became the rabbi of Radziejów Poland.

Leadership roles in Germany

Rabbi in Bergen-Belsen
Rabbi Olewski survived the Holocaust and was liberated in Bergen-Belsen on April 11, 1945. He was appointed to be one of member rabbis of the bais din in Bergen-Belsen and together with the other rabbis was instrumental in permitting numerous agunot to remarry.

Chief Rabbi of Celle
In late 1945, Rabbi Olewski was appointed by the British Chief Rabbi's Religious Council to be the Chief Rabbi of Celle which was located in the British Zone of Germany.In 1949, the British occupation of North-West Germany ended and the British Chief Rabbi's Religious Emergency Council and it's appointees were required to wrap up their operations in Germany. However, the local Jewish community asked Rabbi Olewski to continue as their Rabbi and Rabbi Olewski remained in his position. Ultimately in 1950, he decided to emigrate to the United States.

Rabbi Olewski was also appointed to be one of the member Rabbis of the Vaad Harabonim of The British Zone, which was established and led by Rabbi Yoel Halpern.

Leader of Agudas Yisroel of the British Zone
Rabbi Olewski, together with Rabbi Shlomo Zev Zweigenhaft and Efraim Londoner were the leaders of Agudas Yisroel of the British Zone. Rabbi Olewski very much engaged in advocating for both the spiritual and physical needs to the Jews in the zone.

In the United States
After emigrating to the United States, Rabbi Olewski was appointed to be the principal of the Bostoner yeshiva. Later, Rabbi Olewski was appointed as Rabbi of one of the Gerrer  synagogues in Brooklyn and was the founder of the Gerrer Yeshiva in the United States.

Death
Rabbi Olewski died from cancer in New York City on May 26, 1966 and was buried in Jerusalem, Israel.

References

Polish Orthodox rabbis
20th-century Polish rabbis
1916 births
Holocaust survivors
Mittelbau-Dora concentration camp survivors
Bergen-Belsen concentration camp survivors
1966 deaths
20th-century American rabbis
Polish emigrants to the United States
People from Radziejów County